Mogheytiyeh (also Romanized as Mogheytīyeh; also known as Faḥestān (Persian: فحستان), Mokhestān, Moqbetīyeh, Moqeyţīyali, Moqeyţīyeh, Moqeyţīyeh, Moqeytiyye, Moqītiyeh, Moxestan, Mughaiti, and Seyyed Ḩasan-e Hakīm) is a village in Shalahi Rural District, in the Central District of Abadan County, Khuzestan Province, Iran. At the 2006 census, its population was 794, in 142 families.

References 

Populated places in Abadan County